Ice Upon the Night is the second studio album by Finnish melodic death metal band Immortal Souls. It is Immortal Souls' first album released by the Dutch Fear Dark Records. It was released in March 2003.

Recording
Ice Upon the Night was recorded in November 2002 at Sonic Pump Studios, Helsinki, Finland. The mixing and mastering was done by Nino Laurenne, and Mika Jussila mastered the album at Finnvox Studios, Helsinki. The album was produced by Immortal Souls.

Musically, the album continues on the band's melodic death metal approach as well as the wintry lyrical theme, although the overall tempo has gotten somewhat slower compared to the previous efforts. The session musician Kimmo Pulkkinen sings clean vocals on the song "You" as a duet with Aki Särkioja, in contrast to his death growl vocals. Pulkkinen also sings clean vocals on "Man of Sorrow."

Ice Upon the Night received a positive reception. For example, Mape Ollila, reviewer of Imperiumi.net the biggest metal music site in Finland, gave the album 8 out of 10 and wrote that the band was technically good and that there nothing wrong with the song material. Some fans, however, were not too excited about the slight metalcore influences on same songs, the overall calmer output, nor liked the less wintry cover art on the European release.

Ice Upon the Night was especially marketed to Benelux countries, Germany and Switzerland, and to the United States and Canada through Facedown Records that issued the album with a different, wintry cover.

Track listing

Personnel 

 Aki Särkioja – death growl, bass guitar
 Esa Särkioja – guitar
 Pete Loisa – guitar
 Jupe Hakola – drums

Session musicians
Kimmo Pulkkinen – clean vocals on "You" and "Man of Sorrow"

References

External links
 Immortal Souls' official website

2003 albums
Immortal Souls albums
Facedown Records albums